The high courts are the intermediate appellate courts under the law of Taiwan. The modern court system of Taiwan was founded in 1896, under the Japanese era. Currently there are six high courts and branches in Taiwan.

History
In 1896, the High Court of the Government-General of Taiwan (Taiwan Sōtokufu Kōtō Hōin) was established in Taihoku. This was the supreme court of Taiwan in the Japanese era. Note that the Empire of Japan was granted extraterritoriality in China from late 19th century until World War II. This also handled the trial cases appealed from Taihoku District court regarding Japanese citizens (including Taiwanese and Korean) in the Chinese provinces of Fujian, Guangdong and Yunnan.

After World War II, the Taiwan High Court was established under the Judicial Yuan, with more high court branches were established for the increasing population.

List of high courts

Jurisdiction

The high courts and its branches exercise jurisdiction over the following cases:
 Appeals from judgments of the district courts or their branches as courts of the first instance in ordinary proceedings of civil and criminal cases;
 Interlocutory appeals from rulings of the district courts or their branches in ordinary proceedings;
 First instance criminal cases relating to rebellion, treason, and offenses against friendly relations with foreign states;
 Military appellate cases whose judgments are imprisonment for a definite period rendered by the high military courts and their branches; and
 Other cases prescribed by law.

The high courts and its branch courts are divided into civil, criminal and specialized divisions. Each division is composed of one division chief judge and two associate judges. Additionally, each high court and its branch courts have a clerical bureau, which is headed by a chief clerk who assists the president with administrative affairs.

Cases before the high courts or its branch courts are heard and decided by a panel of three judges. However, one of the judges may conduct preparatory proceedings.

The court has seven civil courts, each of which has one presiding judge and three judges to handle civil appeals of the second instance and counter-appeal cases under the system of collegial panels, but they do not deal with simple litigation.  The Court has eleven criminal courts, each of which has one presiding judge and two or three judges to handle criminal appeals of the second instance and counter-appeal cases under the system of collegial panels as well as litigation of the first instance concerning civil strife, foreign aggression or violation of foreign relations.  Based on various needs, the court manages several professional courts such as the Professional Court of Fair Trade Cases, Family Professional Court, Professional Court of International Trade, Maritime Professional Court, Professional Court of State Compensation, Professional Court of Anti-corruption, Professional Court of Intellectual Property Rights, Professional Court of Juvenile Delinquency, Professional Court of Serious Criminal Cases, Professional Court of Public Security, Professional Court of Fair Trade Act, Professional Court of Sexual Harassment, etc.

See also 

 History of law in Taiwan
 Constitution of the Republic of China
 Supreme Court of the Republic of China
 Ministry of Justice (Taiwan)
 Supreme Prosecutors Office
 Taiwan High Prosecutors Office
 List of law schools in Taiwan

Gallery

References

External links 
 Taiwan Law Resources
 The Judicial Yuan
 Taiwan High Court
 Fuchien High Court Kinmen Branch Court
 The Ministry of Justice

Law of Taiwan
Courts in Taiwan